University of Technology Malaysia (UTM) is a premier Malaysian public research-intensive university ranked 203rd in the world by QS University rankings. Its medium of instruction is English.

History

Industrial Partners 

UTM has regional and international academic collaborations with companies including Intel, Altera, Dyson, Alcon, Shell and Proton.

Synergy 4.0 
In 2018, Universiti Teknologi Malaysia (UTM) has embarked on a unique history when undertaking the restructuring of its academic entity and witnessing the merger of faculty from 18 to seven.

Campuses
UTM has three campuses – the main campus is in Skudai, and was the first university in the state of Johor. It has an area of 1148 hectares and is the second largest public university after Universiti Putra Malaysia (UPM). It is about 20 km north of the state capital, Johor Bahru.

The branch campus is situated in Jalan Semarak within Kuala Lumpur, with an area of 38 hectares. The branch campus accommodates diploma students, part-time students (also known as the SPACE program), undergraduate and postgraduate students (Malaysia-Japan International Institute of Technology (MJIIT) and Razak Faculty of Technology and Informatics (FTIR) and foreign students taking business courses.

The new branch campus located in Pagoh was officially opened on 2 May 2017. Universiti Teknologi Malaysia Innovation Centre in Agritechnology for Advanced Bioprocessing (UTM-ICA) is strategically located off the Pagoh interchange on the north–south expressway, in the district of Muar, Johor. A 50-hectare campus equipped with shared facilities integrated with Bandar University Pagoh.

General 
The Webometrics Ranking of World Universities places UTM in the fourth place in the South East Asia Region, and the top in Malaysia. In the QS University Rankings, it placed 100 in the "Engineering & Technology Universities" category among other world ranked universities in 2016 UTM aims to achieve the status of a global university and rank among 50 of the world's best universities by 2020.

Vice Chancellor of University of Technology Malaysia

Residential colleges (Johor Bahru Campus) 
UTM has on-campus hostel blocks that provide accommodation for students. The hostel blocks are grouped into units known as colleges, for simplifying administration. Each college has three or more hostel blocks under their administration. UTM has 12 colleges, which can accommodate 17,500 students. Among the facilities provided at each residential college are a cafeteria, a multipurpose hall, a Muslim prayer room, tennis courts, an internet and computer center, a convenience store and a common room.

Accommodation 
UTM can provide accommodation for outsiders, i.e. parents or relatives, visiting friends  etc., with Scholar's Inn @ UTM JB and Scholar's Inn @ UTM KL.

The Scholar's Inn @ UTMKL is a city campus hotel at Jalan Semarak, in the heart of Kuala Lumpur. Located within the Universiti Teknologi Malaysia Kuala Lumpur campus and approximately 10 minutes’ drive from KLCC/ Petronas Twin Towers, the hotel is also within range of tourist spots such as the National Library, National Art Gallery, Istana Budaya and the Golden Triangle. Scholar's Inn @ UTMKL comprises 56 rooms and studios, a meeting room, a business centre and the Scholar's Deli.

Academic

Faculties
 
Faculty of Computing (FC)
 Faculty of Chemical and Energy Engineering
Faculty of Electrical Engineering
Faculty of Civil Engineering
Faculty of Mechanical Engineering
 Faculty of Social Sciences and Humanities (FSSH)
 Faculty of Built Environment and Surveying (FABU)
 Department of Architecture
 Department of Quantity Surveying
 Department of Urban and Regional Planning
 Department of Landscape Architecture
 Department of Geoinformation
 Department of Real Estate
 Faculty of Science (FS)
 Department of Physics
 Department of Chemistry
 Department of Mathematical Sciences
 Department of Biosciences
 Azman Hashim International Business School (AHIBS)
 Business Administration
 Accounting & Finance
 Information System
 Razak Faculty of Technology and Informatics
 Engineering and Technology
 Science, Management and Design
 Advance Informatics
 Perdana Centre
 Malaysia-Japan International Institute of Technology (MJIIT)
 Institute Sultan Iskandar
 Language Academy UTM Kuala Lumpur
 FACULTY OF MANAGEMENT

Continuing Education
 School of Professional and Continuing Education (UTMSPACE)
 Centre for Teaching and Learning

Joint programmes
 Joint Programmes & Management Unit

Innovation Centre
 Centre for Student Innovation (UTM CSI)
 Innovation and Commercialization Centre (ICC)
Institute of Bioproduct Development

Networking
These are organisations for joint projects, traineeships, study visits, international conferences, research projects, and funding.
 International Association of Universities (IAU)
 Society of Petroleum Engineering
 The Association of Southeast Asian Institutions of Higher Learning (ASAIHL)
 Federation of the Universities of the Islamic World (FUIW)
 Universities Mobility in Asia and the Pacific (UMAP)
 Association of International Education Administrators (AIEA)
 South-East Asia Technical Universities Consortium (SEATUC)
 American Society for Engineering Education (ASEE)
 European Association for International Education (EAIE)

Global outreach programme
UTM Global Outreach Programme is an international programme designed to develop UTM's students to be global-ready graduates.

Research University
The Ministry of Education formed an ad hoc committee, comprising research from Malaysian universities, to formulate a concept paper on the establishment of research universities (RUs). The content of the paper deals with their vision, missions and goals, the criteria and standard for Rus, their governance, prevision of incentives, accreditation concerns, cost implications and an action plan.

Research Management Centre
Research Management Centre was established in 1982. Formerly known as ‘Research and Consultation Unit’ and as ‘Research & Development Unit’ and finally renamed as ‘Research Management Centre’, in 1997.

RMC manages research and development activities, intellectual property creation and management, technological development, promotion and exploitation of R&D findings through close collaboration with the Ministry of Higher Education, Ministry of Science, Technology & Innovation, Small and Medium Industry Development Corporation, industry, research institutes, other universities and international organisations.

RMC manages funds from research grant schemes available such as Science Fund, Techno Fund, Inno Fund, Fundamental Research Grant Scheme (FRGS), Commercialization of R&D Fund (CRDF), Technology Acquisition Fund (TAF) and Multimedia Grant Scheme (MGS).

Research fundings
 MOSTI grants
 Demonstrator Application Grant Scheme (DAGS)
 ScienceFund
 TechnoFund
 MOHE grants
 Fundamental Research Grant Scheme (FRGS)
 Exploratory Research Grant Scheme (ERGS)
 Long-term Research Grant Scheme (LRGS)
 Prototype Research Grant Scheme (PRGS)
 MOA
 UTM grants
 UTM Short Term Grant
 Research University Grant (GUP)
 Institutional Research Grant (Top-Down)
 Other Agencies
 Contract research

Rankings

Notable alumni
 

The alumni of University of Technology Malaysia include politicians and public service officials such as Datuk Seri Ir. Dr. Wee Ka Siong, former Malaysian Minister of Transport, Tan Sri Datuk Seri Panglima Haji Annuar Musa, former Malaysian Minister of Communications and Multimedia, Dato' Seri Hamzah Zainudin, former Malaysian Minister of Home Affairs, Dato' Seri Saarani Mohamad, current Menteri Besar of Perak and IGP Dato' Seri Panglima Acryl Sani Abdullah Sani, current Malaysian Inspector-General of Police.

Partner Institution

Australia
University of Sydney
University of Tasmania
Queensland University of Technology

China
Beijing University of Aeronautics and Astronautics
Chinese Academy of Sciences

Japan
Kyoto University
Osaka University

Malaysia
Universiti Tunku Abdul Rahman

United Kingdom
Imperial College London
University of Cambridge
University of Leeds
University of Oxford

United States
Massachusetts Institute Of Technology

See also
 List of universities in Malaysia

References

External links

 

 
Technical universities and colleges in Malaysia
Engineering universities and colleges in Malaysia
Educational institutions established in 1904
Business schools in Malaysia
Information technology schools in Malaysia
1904 establishments in British Malaya
Internet mirror services